Prowse is a surname. Notable people with the surname include:

Albert Prowse (1858–1925), Canadian political figure
Andrew Prowse (fl. 1980s–present), Australian film and TV director
Benjamin Charles Prowse (1862–1930), Canadian political figure
Charles Bertie Prowse (1869–1916), British Army officer
Daniel Woodley Prowse (1834–1914), Canadian political figure
David Prowse (1935–2020), British athlete and actor
David Prowse (politician) (born 1941), Australian political figure
Edgar Prowse (1905–1977), Australian political figure
George Prowse (1896–1918), British sailor who won a Victoria Cross in World War I
Heydon Prowse (born 1981), British journalist and actor
Ian Prowse (fl. 1990s–present), British musician
James Harper Prowse (1913–1976), Canadian political figure
Jane Prowse (fl. 1990s–present), US playwright and author 
John Prowse (1871–1944), Australian political figure
Juliet Prowse (1936–1996),  South African-American dancer and actress
Lemuel E. Prowse (1858–1925), Canadian political figure
Philip Prowse (born 1937), Scottish theatre director
Robert Henry Prowse (1828–1924), Canadian political figure
Samuel Prowse (1835–1902), Canadian political figure
Thomas Prowse (MP), MP for Somerset from 1740 to 1767
Thomas William Lemuel Prowse (1888–1973), Canadian political figure
William Prowse (1752–1826), British naval officer
William Jeffrey Prowse (1839–1870), British author

Fictional characters:
Emily Prowse, character in the television series Jericho
Jonah Prowse, character in the television series Jericho